The 2020–21 Michigan Tech Huskies men's basketball team will represent Michigan Tech in the 2020–21 NCAA Division II men's basketball season. The Huskies will be led by 27th-year head coach Kevin Luke and will play their home games at Sherman Stadium in Houghton, Michigan as members of the Great Lakes Intercollegiate Athletic Conference.

Previous season

Regular season
The Huskies finished 20-8, 14-6 in the GLIAC, in the 2020-21 season prior to the start of the GLIAC tournament

Post Season
Despite the NCAA Tournament getting cancelled for all teams, from DI through DIII, the Huskies were able to participate in the GLIAC tournament and won all three games that they participated in.

Their opponents in the Tournament were Saginaw Valley, Grand Valley State, and Northwood

The Huskies were number three in the GLIAC, when the season ended, pairing them with 6-seed Saginaw Valley

Offseason

Coaching Changes 
On December 21, 2020, Josh Buettner was promoted to the Associate Head Coach position for the Michigan Tech men's basketball program.

Departures
Three players for the Michigan Tech that were on the 2019-20 roster for the Huskies weren't on the 2020-21 roster, including Senior Ryan Schuller who graduated from the University. The former of the pair of articles doesn't state directly that Schuller graduated, but appears as though he did given the phrases expressed in the article.

Preseason

Preseason Rankings
The Huskies weren't ranked in the Preseason Top 25

COVID-19
Due to the COVID-19 pandemic, all sports related to the GLIAC, have been postponed to January 1, 2021. This comes after a unanimous decision by the Great Lakes Intercollegiate Athletic Conference Council of Presidents and Chancellors on August 12, 2020.

Roster

Schedule and Results
On Thursday, November 12, 2020, the GLIAC announced the games that would be played throughout the regular season for each of the participating members of the conference. Michigan Tech and Northern Michigan are travel partners for this season, meaning they don't play their games back-to-back, unlike the rest of their games. This goes for the rest of the conference as well.
After ending the season with a 3-game win streak (1 against Grand Valley State and Parkside), the Huskies got a 3-seed in the GLIAC Tournament, meaning they would go against six-seed Purdue Northwest, who they went against the first weekend in the regular season. They beat Purdue Northwest and Grand Valley State to make the GLIAC Championship Game. In the Championship, Michigan Tech went up against 5-seed Ashland, who won the matchup 85-77. On March 6 or 7, The DII 48-team bracket was released, and Michigan Tech was placed as a 2-seed, giving them a one-game bye. The Huskies' first game of the bracket will be played on Sunday, March 14, 2021 against three-seed Southern Indiana, following their win over fifth-seed Lewis on Saturday, March 13. Following the Huskies' win over 3-seed Southern Indiana, and 1-seed Truman's win over 5-seed Ashland, Truman beat Michigan Tech 65-62. The Huskies were outscored 26-16 in the first half, and outscored Truman 44-37 in the second half.

|-
!colspan=9 style=|GLIAC regular season

|-
!colspan=9 style=|GLIAC tournament

|-
!colspan=9 style=|NCAA DII Men's Tournament 2021

|-

Player statistics 

Source

Rankings
The Huskies' ranks are taken from the D2SIDA Poll, and the Coaches Poll from NABC Coaches

Awards and honors

Regular Season Awards

Owen White 

 GLIAC North Player of the Week

Post-season awards

Owen White 

 Third Team Academic All-American
 Academic All-District

References 

Michigan Tech Huskies men's basketball seasons
Michigan Tech
Michigan Tech